Dead Throne is the fourth studio album by American metalcore band The Devil Wears Prada. It was released on September 13, 2011, through Ferret Music. Produced by Adam Dutkiewicz, the record was recorded in several studios across the United States from November 2010 – April 2011. The album is a follow up to The Devil Wears Prada's 2009 album, With Roots Above and Branches Below. Much like their previous efforts the album's lyrics were penned by lead vocalist Mike Hranica, whose lyrical direction focused on anti-idolatry concepts. The band's musical style changed after the success of the Zombie EP, this led to, what Hranica described as; fusing the melodic elements of their previous studio albums with the ferocity of Zombie.

Background and recording 
Since the time of The Devil Wears Prada's fame, their past approach of all band members sitting down and writing a record, hasn't been used collaboratively since Plagues, it is noted by guitarist Chris Rubey that about midway through the writing process of their third full-length With Roots Above and Branches Below, their songwriting style and process changed drastically. Vocalist, Hranica commented on the album's lyrical theme is based upon anti-idolatry. He also said it's the "heaviest and most aggressive album to date."

Hranica speaks on the evolution of the band as a whole: "Our early material was dumb, plain and simple, and moving away from that, I think we've grown into smarter, more creative riffs, along with easier to follow songs. It's things like that that mark the evolution of TDWP." The album also features the absence of clean vocal passages on select songs, this is the first time The Devil Wears Prada has done this since Dear Love: A Beautiful Discord. Dead Throne was recorded from November 2010 to April 2011, with the sessions taking place three different recording studios in the United States, which were Zing Studios in Westfield, Massachusetts, Blacklodge Studios in Eudora, Kansas and The Foundation Recording Studios in Connersville, Indiana.

Composition

Influences, style and themes
Mike Hranica explained that Dead Throne did not need "to sound a certain way throughout." Rhythm guitarist Jeremy DePoyster's clean vocals are still contrasted with a wide array of screamed vocals, which are featured more prominently than clean singing. Lead guitarist and primary songwriter Chris Rubey stated that the musical direction of the album on the Zombie EP was "heavier, more sinister, and zombie-like. Those songs were written pretty much solely by me on my computer and that’s why they sound different. For Dead Throne we wanted to do that and obviously bring in some of the other elements people liked in Plagues.

While Zombie was centrally themed lyrically and musically around a specific topic, Dead Throne conveys a central message with common themes "revolving around idols." Hranica expands when asked about his lyrical themes, which have always been very abstract and metaphorical in order to draw out different meanings depending on the interpreter:

Hranica also stated that many of the album's negative themes were inspired from the ending of his five-year relationship.

Critical reception

The album received generally positive reviews from music critics. At Metacritic, which assigns a normalized rating out of 100 to reviews from mainstream critics, the album received an average score of 76, based on 6 reviews, which indicates "generally favorable reviews".  The album was credited for its more experimental and orchestral take on metalcore, and less produced and more violent sound.  Ryan Williford of Audiopinions gave the album a 7.5 out of 10 describing the band's choice of producer, Adam Dutkiewicz as a wise move for the band. This is because Williford believes that Joey Sturgis, who produced all of their discography prior to Dead Throne, overproduces his work. He credited the record for its rawer and more natural sound. Drew Beringer of AbsolutePunk also favored Dead Throne for the variety on the record, particularly praising The Devil Wears Prada for their instrumental song "Kansas" and their evolution as songwriters. Jason Lymangrover on a review for Allmusic gave the album three and a half stars out of five, describing it as being "at its most technical and most brutal" and comparing it to "technical metalcore and European symphonic metal."

Wayne Reimer of Jesus Freak Hideout, appreciated the progression from The Devil Wears Prada's third studio album, With Roots Above and Branches Below to Dead Throne as well as crediting the band's drummer, Daniel Williams, for his performance on the record, praising his creativity in the songs and his lack of double bass pedal motions to fill his role. Reimer went as far to say "The tempo fluctuates effortlessly and fluidly throughout each track; this is not to be taken for granted." In Adrian Garza's review for Christian Music Zine (giving 4.5 out of 5) he praises the vocal performance of clean vocalist Jeremy DePoyster and musical development shown on the album: "Jeremy DePoyster has really stepped up his vocal game, the vocals sound so much less produced, in a good way. Aside from the more experimental tracks on the album, there aren’t really any crazy synthesizer sounds, now it’s mostly piano and strings."

Not all reviews were positive, however. Connor O’Brien of Alter the Press! gave the album 1.5 out of five, believing that the album shows no progression for the band, stating: "It seems that TDWP have evolved within their own distinction, yet are left seemingly years behind the rest of the genre." Ryan Williford of Audio Opinions alongside O'Brien sees it as only a "step in the right direction" saying, "Once they start writing something original will be the release that will excite everyone again."

Commercial performance
Dead Throne is their highest charting release, peaking at No. 10 on the Billboard 200, selling 32,420 copies in its first week. It also topped the Billboard Christian Albums and Independent Albums chart, as well as peaking at No. 3 on the Rock Albums Chart and No. 40 on the 2011 Billboard year-end Hard Rock Albums chart. This is the last album to feature James Baney before he left the band on February 22, 2012. There is also a guest vocal appearance by Tim Lambesis on "Constance".

The album has sold 92,000 copies in the U.S.

Track listing

Notes
The instrumental song "Kansas" has a spoken audio sample from Southern Baptist preacher Paul Washer.

Personnel

The Devil Wears Prada
Daniel Williams – drums
Andy Trick – bass guitar
Chris Rubey – lead guitar, backing vocals
Jeremy DePoyster – rhythm guitar, clean vocals
Mike Hranica – lead vocals, additional guitars
James Baney – keyboard, synthesizer, piano

Production
Produced by The Devil Wears Prada and Adam Dutkiewicz
Engineered by Adam Dutkiewicz and Jim Fogarty
Mixed by Adam Dutkiewicz
Mastered by Tom Baker
Synthesizer producer, keyboards by Joey Sturgis
Additional vocal production by Jeremy McKinnon
Booking by Dave Shapiro of The Agency Group
Artwork by Dan Seagrave

Charts

References 

2011 albums
The Devil Wears Prada (band) albums
Albums produced by Adam Dutkiewicz
Albums with cover art by Dan Seagrave
Ferret Music albums
Roadrunner Records albums